The West Black Sea Region (Turkish: Batı Karadeniz Bölgesi) (TR8) is a statistical region in Turkey.

Subregions and provinces 

 Zonguldak Subregion (TR81)
 Zonguldak Province (TR811)
 Karabük Province (TR812)
 Bartın Province (TR813)
 Kastamonu Subregion (TR82)
 Kastamonu Province (TR821)
 Çankırı Province (TR822)
 Sinop Province (TR823)
 Samsun Subregion (TR83)
 Samsun Province (TR831)
 Tokat Province (TR832)
 Çorum Province (TR833)
 Amasya Province (TR834)

Age groups

Internal immigration

State register location of West Black Sea residents

Marital status of 15+ population by gender

Education status of 15+ population by gender

See also 

 NUTS of Turkey

References

External links 
 TURKSTAT

Sources 
 ESPON Database

Statistical regions of Turkey